Akkineni is an Indian surname that may refer to

 Akkineni Lakshmi Vara Prasada Rao, popularly known as L. V. Prasad was a famous Indian film actor, producer and director
 Akkineni Ramesh Prasad son of Akkineni Lakshmi Vara Prasada Rao
 Akkineni Sreekar Prasad, National award-winning film editor, grandson of L. V. Prasad
 Akkineni Kutumba Rao veteran filmmaker
 Akkineni Nageswara Rao, veteran Telugu film actor and producer
 Akkineni Nagarjuna, a popular Telugu film actor and producer; son of Akkineni Nageswara Rao
 Amala Akkineni, an actress; wife of Akkineni Nagarjuna
 Akkineni Naga Chaitanya, a Telugu film actor; son of Akkineni Nagarjuna and his ex-wife, Lakshmi Ramanaidu Daggubati
Samantha Akkineni, Actress;Former wife of Akkineni Naga Chaitanya
 Akkineni Akhil, son of Akkineni Nagarjuna and Akkineni Amala

See also
Daggubati-Akkineni family

Indian surnames